St. Dominics International School is a school in São Domingos de Rana, Cascais, near Lisbon, in Portugal. It was founded by Irish Dominican Sisters, beginning as the Bom Sucesso Girls Day School in 1954. Transition to a co-educational school began in 1963.

History
With the building of the bridge over the Tagus River, now called the 25 de Abril Bridge, the expanding English expatriate community asked the sisters to establish a new school. St Dominic's College, English language co-educational school was founded in the Bom Sucesso convent. The school started with fewer than 20 students but quickly needing more space. The new school opened on its present site in 1975. It was named St Dominic's International School in 1988.

Administration
In 2010 St Dominic's was sold to Veritas Educatio/SA, whose owners are Catarina Formigo, Filipe Pinhal and Joaquim Marques dos Santos.

Programme
The school offers the IB Diploma Programme at all three levels — Primary Years Programme (since December 1997), Middle Years Programme and the Diploma Programme (both since December 1994) — the only school in Portugal offering all three programs.

Student body
It is an English-speaking school, with children of around 50 different nationalities.

Alumni
Annabelle Wallis, English actress

References

External links

 St. Dominic’s International School (official website)

Education in Lisbon
Educational institutions established in 1954
International Baccalaureate schools in Portugal
International schools in Portugal
1954 establishments in Portugal